David Joseph Hall (born 27 October 1963 in Adelaide, South Australia) is an Australian horse trainer.

The son of trainer, Joe Hall, he obtained his trainer's license in 1988 at Morphettville. In 1993, he moved to race in Melbourne where he became famous for training Makybe Diva to the first of her three successive Melbourne Cup victories in 2003.

David Hall was granted a trainer license by the Hong Kong Jockey Club in 2004.

In 2010/11, he trained 21 winners and by the end of that season had run up an overall Hong Kong total of 209. In 2013/14 he trained 25 winners, including Bubble Chic who won the HKG3 Premier Plate and HKG3 Queen Mother Memorial Cup. He has accrued an overall Hong Kong total of 292.

Significant horses
 Absolute Champion

Performance

References

The Hong Kong Jockey Club – Trainer Information
The Hong Kong Jockey Club 

1963 births
Living people
Australian racehorse trainers
Sportspeople from Adelaide
Hong Kong horse trainers